The 1947 Fort Valley State Wildcats football team was an American football team that represented Fort Valley State College in the Southern Intercollegiate Athletic Conference (SIAC) during the 1947 college football season. Led by head coach Richard Craig, the team compiled a 7–0–1 record in eight regular season games. The Wildcats were ranked No. 15 among the nation's black college football teams according to the Pittsburgh Courier and its Dickinson Rating System. 

After going through its eight-game regular season with an undefeated record, Fort Valley was regarded as the "Cinderella team" of 1947 and received an invitation to play No. 8 Southern in the Yam Bowl in Dallas. Southern defeated Fort Valley by a 46–0 score on Christmas Day.

Key players included halfback Ted Bey, Webb Hollis, Joseph Davis, and Carl Cannon. William E. McKinney was the assistant coach.

Schedule

References

Fort Valley State
Fort Valley State Wildcats football seasons
Fort Valley State football